Allsvenskan 1998, part of the 1998 Swedish football season, was the 74th Allsvenskan season played. AIK won the league ahead of runners-up Helsingborgs IF, while BK Häcken and Östers IF were relegated. AIK won the title despite having the fewest goals (25) scored in the league.

Of the 315 players who participated, fewer than half (147) were full-time professional footballers. Many were students, while just over a quarter (81) had full-time jobs outside football, although this proportion had substantially reduced from previous Allsvenskan seasons.

League table

Relegation play-offs

Results

Season statistics

Top scorers

Footnotes

References 

Print
 
 
 

Online
 
 

Allsvenskan seasons
Swed
Swed
1